Asemota is an Edo surname. Notable people with the surname include:

 Eghosa Asemota Agbonifo, Nigerian politician
 Helen Asemota, Jamaican based biochemist and agricultural biotechnologist
 Leo Asemota, Nigerian artist
 Reality Asemota, Nigerian footballer
 Solomon Adun Asemota, Nigerian lawyer